Odludek is the debut solo album by Jimi Goodwin, released on Heavenly Recordings on 24 March 2014. The album follows a few years after his band, Doves, announced they were taking an "indefinite hiatus." The word odludek is a Polish word, meaning "pilgrim" or "loner." Goodwin wrote and played almost everything on Odludek himself, with only a handful of guest musicians, including Elbow frontman Guy Garvey and former Dungen member Fredrik Bjorling, and the album was recorded and co-produced with Dan Austin at a studio in the Forest of Dean across 18 months. Goodwin said, "Initially I wanted to have loads of guests on it. Maybe I wasn't trusting my own instincts because I'd collaborated in a band for such a long time, but that idea soon went out the window. Very quickly I decided I wanted to get my Prince head on and play everything. I became very protective of it. There was no-one steering me. I made it myself and paid for it myself, and that was very free and liberating."

Odludek spawned four promotional-only singles; second single "Live Like a River" was given a commercial release on 12" vinyl, featuring exclusive remixes of the title track and album opener "Terracotta Warrior". A dub remix of "Didsbury Girl" was released as a vinyl single for Record Store Day 2015.

Track listing

Charts

References

Heavenly Recordings albums
2014 albums
Jimi Goodwin albums
Albums produced by Dan Austin